The Jacob Mincer Award is an economic award issued by the Society of Labour Economics (SOLE) honouring lifetime contributions to the field of labour economics.

Initially named the "Career Achievement Award for Lifetime Contributions to the Field of Labor Economics", the prize was first awarded to Jacob Mincer and Gary Becker in 2004, and was subsequently known as the "Mincer Award"".
The award is to be presented annually, provided a suitable nominee is found, by a committee appointed by the society President and approved by the Executive Board.

Three winners of the Jacob Mincer Award have also been awarded the Nobel Memorial Prize in Economic Sciences.

Recipients

References

 Economics awards